Leucotmemis vicentia is a moth of the subfamily Arctiinae. It was described by Zerny in 1931. It is found in Colombia.

References

 Natural History Museum Lepidoptera generic names catalog

Leucotmemis
Moths described in 1931